Bulldog Drummond at Bay is a 1937 British mystery film based on the novel of the same name directed by Norman Lee and starring John Lodge, Dorothy Mackaill and Claud Allister. It was made at Elstree Studios.

Synopsis
Bulldog Drummond goes up against a gang of foreign agents who are members of a British pacifist organisation called "The Key".  The agents kidnap an inventor to steal the plans for a top-secret robot aircraft.

Cast
 John Lodge as Hugh Drummond
 Dorothy Mackaill as Doris Thompson
 Victor Jory as Gregoroff
 Claud Allister as Algy Longworth
 Richard Bird as Caldwell
 Hugh Miller as Ivan Kalinsky
 Leslie Perrins as Maj. Grayson
 Brian Buchel as Meredith
 Jim Gérald as Veight
 Maire O'Neill as Norah, the Housekeeper
 Annie Esmond as Mrs. Caldwell
 Frank Cochrane as Dr. Belfrus
 William Dewhurst as Reginald Portside
 Wilfrid Hyde-White as Conrad (uncredited)

References

External links

Films based on Bulldog Drummond
1937 films
British mystery thriller films
1930s mystery thriller films
Films shot at British International Pictures Studios
1930s English-language films
British black-and-white films
Films directed by Norman Lee
Republic Pictures films
Films with screenplays by Patrick Kirwan
British robot films
1930s British films